The 2021 Italian local elections were held on 3 and 4 October. Originally scheduled as usual between 15 April and 15 June with run-offs two weeks later, the Government of Italy announced on 4 March that they were postponed to after the summer due to the COVID-19 pandemic in Italy. Elections took place in 1,293 out of 7,903 municipalities, 20 of which are provincial capitals. Mayors and city councils have been elected for the ordinary five-year terms, lasting till 2026.

Voting system
The voting system is used for all mayoral elections in Italy in the cities with a population higher than 15,000 inhabitants. Under this system, voters express a direct choice for the mayor or an indirect choice voting for the party of the candidate's coalition. If no candidate receives 50% of votes during the first round, the top two candidates go to a second round after two weeks. The winning candidate obtains a majority bonus equal to 60% of seats. During the first round, if no candidate gets more than 50% of votes but a coalition of lists gets the majority of 50% of votes or if the mayor is elected in the first round but its coalition gets less than 40% of the valid votes, the majority bonus cannot be assigned to the coalition of the winning mayor candidate.

The election of the City Council is based on a direct choice for the candidate with a maximum of two preferential votes, each for a different gender, belonging to the same party list: the candidate with the majority of the preferences is elected. The number of the seats for each party is determined proportionally, using D'Hondt seat allocation. Only coalitions with more than 3% of votes are eligible to get any seats.

Municipal elections

Mayoral election results

See also
2021 Rome municipal election
2021 Milan municipal election
2021 Naples municipal election
2021 Turin municipal election
2021 Bologna municipal election

References

2021 elections in Italy
 
Italian local elections 2021
 
Municipal elections in Italy
October 2021 events in Italy